Keegan Hansen Bradley (born June 7, 1986) is an American professional golfer who competes on the PGA Tour. He has won five tour events, most notably the 2011 PGA Championship. He is one of six golfers to win in his major debut, along with Ben Curtis, Fred Herd, Willie Park, Sr., Francis Ouimet and Horace Rawlins. He was the 2011 PGA Tour Rookie of the Year and has briefly featured in the top ten of the Official World Golf Ranking.

Early life and college career
Bradley is the elder child of Mark Bradley, the head professional at the Jackson Hole Golf and Tennis Club just outside Jackson, Wyoming. Growing up as an all-state ski racer in Woodstock, Vermont, Bradley decided as a teenager to pursue golf over skiing. He lived in Portsmouth, New Hampshire in 2001 and 2002 when his father was an assistant pro at Portsmouth Country Club. He then moved to Hopkinton, Massachusetts prior to his senior year at Hopkinton High School, where he won the Massachusetts Interscholastic Athletic Association (MIAA) Division 2 individual state championship in 2004. Hopkinton coach Dick Bliss later recalled that Bradley received the third-most attention of his players that season, and that "not many big-time college recruiters gave him much of a look." Bradley attended St. John's University and won nine collegiate events before graduating in 2008.

Professional career

2008-2010: Early years
Bradley turned professional in 2008 and began playing on the NGA Hooters Tour, where he won at Southern Dunes in his fifth and final start of the year. 
Bradley won a second Hooters Tour event in 2009 at the Texas Honing Open. 
He made 22 cuts in 26 events that season and earned $84,000. He also played two Nationwide Tour events that year, making the cut in both of them. He attempted to earn a 2010 PGA Tour card through qualifying school but fell short by two strokes. In 2010, Bradley played on the Nationwide Tour, where he recorded four consecutive top-five finishes late in the season to finish 14th on the money list and earn his PGA Tour card for 2011.

2011: PGA rookie season, first major win
Bradley made the cut in his first PGA Tour event, the 2011 Sony Open in Hawaii, and finished T-7 the following week at the Bob Hope Classic. He added a second top 10 finish at the Valero Texas Open in April. Bradley won his first PGA Tour event at the 2011 HP Byron Nelson Championship. He defeated Ryan Palmer on the first hole of a sudden-death playoff. The victory gained him entry into the 2011 WGC-Bridgestone Invitational, where he shared the 36-hole lead and led midway through the final round before finishing T-15.

PGA Championship
The week after the WGC-Bridgestone Invitational, Bradley played in his first major, the 2011 PGA Championship. A second-round 64 propelled him into a share of the lead at the halfway stage, and Bradley remained only one shot out of the lead after 54 holes. In the final round, he triple-bogeyed the 15th hole to fall five shots behind Jason Dufner with three holes to play before recovering with back-to-back birdies on 16 and 17 which, combined with three consecutive bogeys for Dufner, left Dufner and Bradley tied after 72 holes of regulation play. Bradley won the three-hole playoff with a birdie and two pars, while Dufner went par-bogey-birdie to finish one stroke behind. Bradley became only the third player after Francis Ouimet (1913) and Ben Curtis (2003) to win a major in his first attempt, and was the first golfer to win a major with a long putter. He also became the seventh consecutive first-time major winner and the first American major champion since Phil Mickelson won the 2010 Masters. With the victory, Bradley moved from number 108 to number 29 in the Official World Golf Ranking.

In December, he was named the PGA Tour Rookie of the Year.

2012
At the 2012 Northern Trust Open, Bradley and Phil Mickelson each made long birdie putts on the 72nd hole to force a three-man playoff with Bill Haas, who made a 45-foot birdie putt on the second playoff hole to win the tournament. During the final round of the event, Bradley was seen numerous times spitting on the course in between hitting his shots. He later apologized and cited his nervous reflex as the cause of the excessive spitting. Bradley held a two-stroke lead during the final round of the 2012 WGC-Cadillac Championship but dropped four shots over the final four holes, including a double bogey on the 18th, to finish T-8. He started the season with nine consecutive top-25 finishes, then had just one in his next ten outings. In June, Bradley played in Europe for the first time at The Irish Open at Royal Portrush and missed the cut.

WGC-Bridgestone Invitational
Bradley won his third PGA Tour event at the 2012 WGC-Bridgestone Invitational by a stroke over Jim Furyk and Steve Stricker. Entering the final round trailing Jim Furyk by four strokes, Bradley narrowed the deficit to one going to the final hole. Bradley converted a 15-foot par putt while Furyk made double bogey to lose by one stroke. Bradley became the 11th player to win a major championship and a World Golf Championship. The win elevated Bradley to 15th in the world rankings. He moved up to a career high of 12th the next week, when he finished T3 at the 2012 PGA Championship. For the season, Bradley finished 10th on the PGA Tour's money list.

Bradley qualified for the 2012 Ryder Cup, marking his first appearance in any cup competition.

2013
Bradley had two second-place finishes in 2013. The first occurred in May at the HP Byron Nelson Championship where he shot a course-record 60 at the TPC Four Seasons in the first round. Bradley had a one-shot lead going into the final round but was overtaken by Sang-Moon Bae. In August, Bradley finished second again, this time by seven strokes, to Tiger Woods at the WGC-Bridgestone Invitational at Firestone. For the season Bradley had seven top-tens and finished 11th on the PGA Tour's money list. Following the season, Bradley was a member of the winning United States team at the Presidents Cup played at Muirfield Village in Ohio.

2014
Bradley's highest finish in 2014 was a second place at the Arnold Palmer Invitational at Bay Hill. Adam Scott faltered during Sunday's final round but it was Matt Every rather than Bradley who won a come-from-behind victory.  For the season Bradley had six top-tens and finished 28th on the PGA Tour's money list. Following the season, Bradley was a captain's pick for the Ryder Cup played in Scotland.

2015
In 2015 Bradley had his worst season since joining the PGA Tour. Playing 24 events Bradley only had three top-tens and finished 64th on the PGA Tour's money list. For the first time in four years Bradley did not represent the United States in a year-end international competition.

2016–2017
These were two down years for Bradley. He didn't win a tournament and finished 114 and 51 on the PGA Tour money list.

2017–2018
In 2018, Bradley won the BMW Championship. This event was part of the FedEx Cup Playoffs. He qualified for the season-ending Tour Championship and finished 8th in the season-long FedEx Cup.

2018–2019
In June 2019, Bradley shot −13 for the week at the Travelers Championship and finished tied for second with Zack Sucher. The winner that week was Chez Reavie.

2022
In October 2022, Bradley won the Zozo Championship for his fifth PGA Tour victory and his first since the 2018 BMW Championship.

Personal life
Bradley's aunt is former LPGA player and World Golf Hall of Fame member Pat Bradley. As a child he attended some of her tournaments and he has called her an inspiration. His other aunt, Peggy, is a 7-time Women's Club Champion at York Golf and Tennis Club in York, Maine. He is a fan of Boston Red Sox baseball, Boston Celtics basketball, New England Patriots football and Boston Bruins hockey, and has said his dream golf foursome includes his father, Ben Hogan, and Tom Brady.
Bradley considers frequent practice-round partner Phil Mickelson a mentor, and he credits Mickelson for helping him win the 2011 PGA Championship. Bradley is also close friends with Jason Dufner and was one of the first to personally congratulate him after his victory in the 2011 PGA Championship.

Amateur wins
2005 The Tillinghast
2006 The Tillinghast, UTSA Invitational
2007 Treasure Coast Classic, Lacrosse Homes Collegiate Invitational
2008 Hawk's Invitational, Palmas Del Mar Intercollegiate, Ironwood Intercollegiate, Princeton Invitational

Professional wins (11)

PGA Tour wins (5)

1Co-sanctioned by the Japan Golf Tour, but unofficial money event.

PGA Tour playoff record (3–1)

NGA Hooters Tour wins (2)
2008 Southern Dunes
2009 Texas Honing Open

Other wins (4)

Other playoff record (1–0)

Major championships

Wins (1) 

1Defeated Jason Dufner in a three-hole playoff: Bradley (3-3-4=10), Dufner (4-4-3=11).

Results timeline
Results not in chronological order in 2020.

CUT = missed the half-way cut
"T" = tied
NT = No tournament due to COVID-19 pandemic

Summary

Most consecutive cuts made – 6 (2011 PGA – 2013 Masters)
Longest streak of top-10s – 1 (four times)

Results in The Players Championship

CUT = missed the halfway cut
"T" indicates a tie for a place
C = Canceled after the first round due to the COVID-19 pandemic

World Golf Championships

Wins (1)

Results timeline
Results not in chronological order before 2015.

1Cancelled due to COVID-19 pandemic

QF, R16, R32, R64 = Round in which player lost in match play
NT = No tournament
"T" = Tied
Note that the Championship and Invitational were discontinued from 2022.

PGA Tour career summary

* As of the 2022 season.

U.S. national team appearances
Professional
Ryder Cup: 2012, 2014
Presidents Cup: 2013 (winners)
CVS Health Charity Classic: 2017 (winners), 2018 (winners), 2019 (winners)

See also
2010 Nationwide Tour graduates
List of men's major championships winning golfers

References

External links

Keegan Bradley profile at St. John's University Athletic Department site

American male golfers
St. John's Red Storm men's golfers
PGA Tour golfers
Winners of men's major golf championships
Ryder Cup competitors for the United States
Korn Ferry Tour graduates
Golfers from Vermont
Golfers from Massachusetts
People from Woodstock, Vermont
People from Hopkinton, Massachusetts
Sportspeople from Middlesex County, Massachusetts
1986 births
Living people